The Central City Community School District is a rural public school district headquartered in Central City, Iowa.

The district is completely within Linn County, and serves Central City, Prairieburg, and the surrounding rural areas.

Tim Cronin has served as superintendent since 2013, and in 2019, started a shared role with Dunkerton Community School District.

Schools
The district operates two schools, in one facility in Central City:
 Central City Elementary School
 Central City High School

Central City High School

Athletics
The Wildcats participate in the Tri-Rivers Conference in the following sports:
Football
Cross Country
Volleyball
Basketball
Wrestling
 1922 State Champions 
Golf
Track and Field
Soccer (competing with Marion) 
Baseball
 1956 State Champions 
Softball

See also
List of school districts in Iowa
List of high schools in Iowa

References

External links
 Central City Community School District

School districts in Iowa
Education in Linn County, Iowa